Benjamin Franklin Johnson Jr. (May 15, 1931 – May 8, 2020) was an American professional baseball pitcher who appeared in 21 games in Major League Baseball over parts of the  and  seasons for the Chicago Cubs. A native and lifelong resident of Greenwood, South Carolina, he graduated from Greenwood High School and was a veteran of the United States Marine Corps.

He signed his first pro contract with the Boston Braves' organization in 1949 and missed the 1952 and 1953 seasons performing military service in the Korean War. He was 28 years old when he received his first MLB opportunity in the closing weeks of the 1959 Cubs' season, working in four games with two starts. In those starting assignments, against the Cincinnati Reds on September 10 and the Pittsburgh Pirates six days later, he went a total of ten innings pitched and allowed only three earned runs. Chicago won both contests, but Johnson was not involved in either decision. He began 1960 with the Cubs and appeared in 17 games through June 12, all in relief, picking up two wins and one save. He spent the rest of the year with the Triple-A Houston Buffs.

As a major leaguer, Johnson compiled a 2–1 won–lost mark, with that one save, and a 3.91 earned run average. In 46 innings pitched, he allowed 56 hits and 15 bases on balls, striking out 15. He had an extensive minor league baseball career, spanning 14 seasons between 1949 and 1964, and winning 132 games.

Ben Johnson died May 8, 2020, at his home.

References

External links

Venezuelan Professional Baseball League statistics

1931 births
2020 deaths
Atlanta Crackers players
Austin Senators players
Baseball players from South Carolina
Chicago Cubs players
Evansville Braves players
Fort Worth Cats players
Hawaii Islanders players
Houston Buffs players
Leones del Caracas players
American expatriate baseball players in Venezuela
Major League Baseball pitchers
Milwaukee Brewers (minor league) players
Oklahoma City 89ers players
People from Greenwood, South Carolina
Syracuse Chiefs players
Toledo Sox players